The Beyond Visual Line Of Sight (BVLOS) drone medical delivery operations by Throttle Aerospace Systems Pvt Ltd (TAS) consortia consisting of TAS, Honeywell Aerospace (India) and Involi were successfully completed on 26th August 2021.The trials were held within a 15 km radius at Gauribidanur taluk of Chikkaballapur district on the outskirts of Bangalore in Karnataka, India. 

These trials were conducted with their MedCOPTER Delivery drone in the view of aiding last mile delivery of medicines and vaccines to every nook and corner of the country. With the ongoing COVID-19 pandemic in India, these trials open up the possibility to supply life saving medicines and vaccines to the remotest parts of the country in minimum time. 

The BVLOS operations were supervised by various bodies of government of India: Ministry of Home Affairs (India), Indian Air Force, Ministry of Civil Aviation (India), Directorate General of Civil Aviation (India) and Airports Authority of India. To additionally monitor these trials a special committee was also formed and named BVLOS Experiment Assessment and Monitoring Committee (BEAM). To further validate and take extra precautionary measures, the experimental findings of the BVLOS operations were communicated to the BEAM Committee.

References

Unmanned aerial vehicles of India
Honeywell aircraft
Indian Air Force